William Skene may refer to:

 William Forbes Skene (1809–1892), Scottish lawyer and antiquarian
 William Baillie Skene (1838–1911) Scottish academic and political agent
 William Skene (Australian politician)